Carthage South Historic District is a national historic district located at Carthage, Jasper County, Missouri.   The district encompasses 491 contributing buildings in a predominantly residential section Carthage.  It largely developed between about 1875 and 1925 and includes representative examples of Late Victorian and Bungalow / American Craftsman style architecture. Notable buildings include St. Ann's Catholic Church (1908), Former Westminster Presbyterian Church (pre-1888), First United Methodist Church (1925), Carthage Senior High School (1904), First Christian Church (1909), Former Cumberland Presbyterian Church (1892), and Carthage Public Library (1904).

It was listed on the National Register of Historic Places in 1982.

References

Historic districts on the National Register of Historic Places in Missouri
Victorian architecture in Missouri
Bungalow architecture in Missouri
Buildings and structures in Jasper County, Missouri
National Register of Historic Places in Jasper County, Missouri